Oatway is a locational surname. It may refer to:

Alby Oatway (1913–1971), Australian rules footballer
Charlie Oatway (b. 1973), English footballer
Derek Oatway (1931–2003), Bermudian swimmer
James Oatway (b. 1978), South African photojournalist

English-language surnames